Manuel Cabré (January 25, 1890 – February 26, 1984) was a noted Spanish-Venezuelan landscape painter who is remembered as "the painter of El Ávila".

Life and career
Cabré was born on January 25, 1890, in Barcelona, Spain to Spanish sculptor Ángel Cabré i Magriñá (1863–1940) and Concepción A. de Cabré. Throughout his childhood and adolescence, he lived in Venezuela along with his father, who had been invited by President Joaquín Crespo to undertake public works activities in Caracas. At 14, Manuel Cabré entered the Academy of Fine Arts of Caracas, where his father taught Sculpture.

In 1912, along with Leoncio Martinez, Rafael Aguin, Cruz Alvarez Garcia, Julian Alonzo, Antonio Edmundo Monsanto and other artists, Cabré founded the Círculo de Bellas Artes, an anti-academic group which rebelled against Antonio Herrera Toro's teaching methods. Enamored with the Venezuelan landscape, he soon moved to the Cerro El Ávila mountains north of Caracas, where he painted in many different shades and from many different angles. 
After several successful exhibitions in Caracas, he moved to Paris, where he resided until 1930. At this time, he practiced cubism and Impressionism. In 1931, he returned to Venezuela and he dedicated himself to zealously capture nature scenes in his country. In 1951, he won the National Prize for Painting and in 1955, the Herrera Toro Award, in the sixteenth Official Hall, besides other important awards. He was director of Museo de Bellas Artes of Caracas between 1942 and 1946. Manuel Cabré was a landscape painter par excellence, with an excellent grasp on technique, color and form. He died in Caracas on February 26, 1984, leaving behind an extensive collection of art.

References 

1890 births
1984 deaths
People from Barcelona
Venezuelan painters
20th-century Spanish painters
20th-century Spanish male artists
Spanish male painters
Spanish landscape painters
Spanish emigrants to Venezuela